Mecyclothorax georgettae is a species of ground beetle in the subfamily Psydrinae. It was described by Perrault in 1978.

References

georgettae
Beetles described in 1978